The Metric Martyrs was a British advocacy group who campaigned for the freedom to choose what units of measurement are used by traders. The group believed that vendors should have the freedom to mark their goods with imperial weights and measurements alone. This opposes the current legal position that imperial units may be used so long as metric units are also displayed.

The advocacy group was formed by individuals who had been accused of offences related to selling loose produce using imperial measures, including not displaying metric signage, and for using unstamped weighing machines (which had had their stamps removed by the authorities). Newspapers dubbed the group the "metric martyrs" after Chris Howell, then weights and measures spokesman for the Institute of Trading Standards Administration (today the Trading Standards Institute), said that they could martyr themselves if they wanted to.

Legal cases
In 2001 Steve Thoburn, the main defendant in the original case, was convicted of two offences under the Weights and Measures Act 1985 of using weighing equipment that was not stamped by a Weights and Measures Inspector. The stamps had been obliterated because the scales were not capable of weighing in the metric system as well as imperial, and hence were no longer permitted for commercial use. He was initially convicted and given a six-month conditional discharge. In Thoburn v Sunderland City Council the fines were challenged in court; the verdict was in favour of Sunderland City Council, upholding the imposition of the fines. The challenges were made on the grounds that British law does not prohibit the use of imperial units when selling loose goods, but metric units must also be displayed.

The Magistrates' Court's decision was upheld on appeal by the Divisional Court.  A petition for leave to appeal to the House of Lords was refused, as was an application to the European Court of Human Rights (alleging a breach of the right to a fair trial).

Thoburn died of a heart attack in March 2004.

Colin Hunt was convicted in 2001 of six offences under the Price Marking Order 1999 for failing to display a unit price per kilogram.

John Dove and Julian Harman were also convicted in 2001 of two offences under the Price Marking Order 1999 of failing to display a unit price per kilogram, and of two offences of using a scale that was only capable of weighing in the imperial system.

Peter Collins, who was prosecuted in 2000, was not convicted of any criminal offence. Collins appealed to a Magistrates' court to have limits on his street trading licence removed. These limits, to which all traders are subject, allowed him to label his goods in imperial quantities only if metric quantities were also displayed no less prominently.

In 2008, Nic Davison was served with an infringement notice for selling draught beer by the litre rather than pints, at his Polish restaurant in Doncaster. Trading Standards officers threatened Davison with prosecution, and  called on him to change the glasses used in his restaurant. Davison refused, stating the supremacy of EU law in UK law in matters of weights and measures. The case against him was dropped.  Davison had sought the help of then Prime Minister Gordon Brown and of his MP Ed Miliband.

Pardon campaign
UK regulations drawn up in response to EEC/EU weights and measures directives had required the use of metric units for certain activities, including sale by weight or measure in the retail trade of certain produce. Prior to 1 January 2000, these regulations applied to most pre-packaged food but on that date, they were extended to cover selling transactions where the product was weighed in front of the customer. The regulations permitted the equivalent imperial unit to be displayed alongside the metric unit as a "supplementary indicator". In 2007 the European Commission announced that for the cases where metric units were required, it had extended the option to also use imperial units indefinitely. These changes followed from public pressure, and concerns that phasing out dual-labelling would create a trade barrier with the United States, where dual-labelling is required.

In response to the European Commission's announcement, there have been calls for a posthumous pardon for Steve Thoburn, who died after having his petition to the European Court of Human Rights denied. Despite an early day motion by Philip Davies MP, the pardon was denied on the grounds that an offence had been committed under the law which was in force at the time. The 2007 EU announcement was not about a change to existing (2001) legal requirements, but rather abandoned plans for a change in 2009. Moreover, the Office for Criminal Justice Reform claimed that even if the law were to be changed, there would still be no case for a pardon "as citizens are expected to comply with the law as it is at the time".

Regulation and units of measure
In the original case, several statutes were cited including Magna Carta, the Acts of Union 1707 and European Communities Act 1972.

Since medieval times, The Crown has asserted the right to regulate weights and measures in the market place. Even though the barons forced King John to accept Magna Carta in 1215, it was issued in the name of the king. Article 35 stated:

Prior to England and Scotland uniting in 1707, each kingdom enforced their own system of weights and measures. Article 17 of the Act of Union ensured that there was a single system of weights and measures across the newly created United Kingdom by requiring that both nations adopted the English system.

The concept of a single system of measures under government control continues. In 2003 the summary of a government report stated:

See also
 Directive 80/181/EEC
 Metrication in the United Kingdom
 Metrication opposition
 Thoburn v Sunderland City Council

Notes

References

External links
 Metric Martyrs website

Metrication in the United Kingdom
Legal history of the United Kingdom
Metrication opposition
Political advocacy groups in the United Kingdom